MRM2 may refer to:

 Poisk (ISS module), a docking module
 21S rRNA (uridine2791-2'-O)-methyltransferase, an enzyme